The International 420 Dinghy is a sailing dinghy popular for racing and teaching. The hull is fiberglass with internal buoyancy tanks. The 420 has a bermuda rig, spinnaker and trapeze. It has a large sail-area-to-weight ratio, and is designed to plane easily. The 420 is an International class recognised by World Sailing.

History
The International 420 was designed by Christian Maury. The class developed rapidly in France, being adopted nationally as a youth trainer for the larger Olympic class International 470. By the late 1960s the class was adopted by a few UK university sailing clubs for training and team racing.

Construction
The class adopted a policy of "prudent evolution" so as to allow development without making existing dinghies obsolete. The hull's seaworthiness and stability at speed proved to be better than most of its contemporaries, and this together with its modest sail area make it fun to sail in heavy weather and thus an excellent youth trainer, qualities that led to its adoption for that role by the Royal Yachting Association in the mid-1970s. In addition, the international 420 is known for its inherent lightness. The floatability of the boat made for a safer training vessel.

With its trapeze and spinnaker it provides the capability for advanced sailing techniques for international standard sailors, while still remaining affordable and accessible to beginners. The International 420 maintains a large multinational class association. The combination of effective class management, the boat's inherent sailing qualities, and prudent evolution have contributed to the class's continuing success.

Club 420
The Club 420, or C420, is a derivative of the 420 and is not recognized by World Sailing or the International 420 Class Association. Designed by Vanguard boats in the 1970s, it has a heavier hull, reinforced for durability in institutional sailing, and a stiff, untapered mast. The boat is much more simple to sail, yet lacks the performance of the original dinghy due to its extra weight. The Club 420 is used extensively on the youth race circuit in the US, with over 5,000 boats in North America, but is not sailed in most other countries. It cannot be used at I420 class events.

Z420
The Z420 is a transformation of the Club 420. The Z420 hull is  lighter and 40 percent stiffer than the C420. Whereas a C420 hull is composed of six pieces, the Z420 has only three molded components: the hull, the deck, and the mast partners. Unlike the C420, the Z420 does not include a spinnaker or trapeze in its rigging. Z420 boats are specially designed for college sailing and were used at the Inter-Collegiate Sailing Association National Championships in 2014 for the first time.

Events

Open

Open Under 17

Male & Mixed

Female

420 Team Racing World Championships
The boat has been used for team racing in both the ISAF Team Racing World Championship and the ISAF World Sailing Games however the class established its own team racing competition in 2015. Only the International 14 and Optimist (dinghy) class association hold a team racing based World Championships in addition to the two discipline led events.

IYRU Women World Championships

World Sailing – Youth Sailing World Championships
The class has been used extensively at the Youth Sailing World Championships which run by World Sailing this is different to the Class Worlds by way that equipment is supplied and entries are limited to one entry per nations but often from more nations.

Events

Club 420 North American Championship

Club 420 US National Championship

References

External links

 Official international class website
 Official UK class website
 Official Austrian class website
 

 
Dinghies
Sailboat types built by Grampian Marine